In differential geometry, a nodoid is a surface of revolution with constant nonzero mean curvature obtained by rolling a hyperbola along a fixed line, tracing the focus, and revolving the resulting nodary curve around the line.

References

External links
Wolfram Demonstrations: Delaunay Nodoids

Surfaces